Lewis Walton Moody MBE (born 12 June 1978 in Ascot) is an English retired rugby union player. He played for Leicester Tigers and Bath Rugby and was part of the 2003 World Cup winning side.

Moody is known for the enthusiasm with which he played the game, his willingness to chase down opponents and his ability to compete for possession at restarts, which earned him the nickname "Mad Dog" from teammates and supporters.

Background
When Moody was five, he took up mini rugby at Bracknell, when a school friend suggested he join him. He played at Bracknell until the age of 12. He was educated at Eagle House Prep School, then Oakham School in Rutland, where he initially played rugby union at centre before moving to full back. He later studied Business Administration at De Montfort University while playing for Leicester Tigers.

Club career

Moody's meeting Ed Houston signalled the beginning of his rugby career. In the Leicester Tigers youth team, he played flanker. He became the youngest Leicester Tigers' player to play a league game at 18 years and 94 days, a record now surpassed by Ben Youngs. He soon became established as Neil Back's understudy for the openside flanker shirt. Making the Tigers starting XV was difficult however, as internationals Neil Back and Martin Corry took two of the three starting positions, with Paul Gustard and Will Johnson (younger brother of Martin) fighting for the remaining place.

Moody was an unused replacement for the 2001 Heineken Cup Final but started the victorious 2002 Heineken Cup Final, and was a member of the Tigers side in the four Premiership winning seasons in 1999, 2000, 2001 and 2002. The arrival of New Zealand international openside Josh Kronfeld at Leicester in 2001, threatened to relegate Moody to third choice openside. However, Kronfeld failed to settle at the club and despite offers from Harlequins and Bath, Moody decided to stay. After the World Cup success in 2003, he suffered a stress fracture of his foot which took a long time to heal and kept him out of the remaining 2003–04 season. Moody made a return in October 2004, in the Heineken European Cup match against Calvisano.

Moody won his fifth Premiership medal in 2007, starting the final and scoring a try as Leicester defeated Gloucester.

He was injured for much of the 2008–2009 season, which was his Testimonial season for the club, but returned to play in the 73–3 win over Bristol, and featured in both the Heineken Cup final and the Guinness Premiership win. Moody stayed fit for the entire 2009–2010 season, and even captained the side in the home fixture against Sale. The Tigers won the 2009–10 Guinness Premiership, beating Saracens 33–27 at Twickenham.

In the 2010–2011 season, he joined Bath Rugby on a three-year deal along with Sam Vesty.

Moody picked up a knee ligament injury in Bath's 55-16 win over Aironi in January 2011 but had been confident of making the England team for their opening Six Nations clash with Wales on 4 February.

Moody announced his retirement from rugby on 6 March 2012 with immediate effect due to injuries.

International career

Moody scored two tries for England Colts against Wales in April 1997, and was a member of the side that won the Madrid Sevens at the end of that season. He was later called up to the senior team for the 1998–99 "tour from hell" but did not make an appearance.

Moody made his England debut against Canada on 2 June 2001, when the established internationals Neil Back and Richard Hill were touring Australia with the British and Irish Lions. He won a further two caps on the North American tour and scored a try against the US Eagles in San Francisco. He was then called up to the senior squad for the match against Ireland in Dublin in October 2001 and came on to win cap number four.

Continued impressive form saw him challenge his teammate, Neil Back, for the coveted England No.7 shirt, starting in two Six Nations games the following season. Moody displaced Lawrence Dallaglio from the first choice England XV for the 2002/3 autumn internationals scoring a try in the game against New Zealand, but was injured against South Africa and Dallaglio regained his place. He returned to fitness and again featured in Clive Woodward's plans, but a further injury in the first Six Nations match against France threatened to curtail the rest of his season.

He was not considered for the summer tour due to that injury, but recovered well enough to play in the pre-world cup friendlies against France and Wales in the summer, scoring a try in the game at the Millennium Stadium.

He played a part in all seven World Cup matches and came on as a replacement in the final to replace Hill. He won the final line-out in the phase of play which led to Jonny Wilkinson's winning drop goal. He missed the remaining 2003–4 season due to a foot injury. With the retirement of Dallaglio and Back, and Hill out injured, he started all three of England's autumn internationals. Moody remained an England mainstay into 2005.  That year he became the first English player to be sent off at Twickenham, when he was dismissed for fighting during the autumn international with Leicester teammate Alex Tuilagi.

Having missed the 2007 Six Nations Championship through injury, Moody was selected as part of the England squad for the 2007 World Cup in France. Having been named to start a warm up match against France Moody suffered a further injury and consequently was left out of the starting line up for England's first three games of the campaign. Following a disappointing start to the tournament Moody was called into the starting line up for the final pool match against Tonga, where he was lauded for England's much improved competition at the breakdown.

Moody kept his place in the starting line up for the quarter final against Australia where he 'outshone his illustrious opposite number' George Smith. Moody again started the semi final against France, and lined up against South Africa in the World Cup final on 20 October, which England narrowly lost to the southern hemisphere side.

He was picked for the 2008 Six Nations Championship and started in the first game against Wales but was substituted in the first half because of an Achilles tendon injury. He returned to play against the Barbarians in June 2009, but was subsequently dropped from the squad, and appeared in the England Saxons EPS for the 2009–10 Season. Club form and injuries to other opensides such as Tom Rees saw him regain his England starting position for the Autumn Internationals against Australia, Argentina, and New Zealand. He continued this form into the 2010 Six Nations Championship.

Moody captained England in their final 2010 Six Nations Championship match against France in Paris, replacing regular captain Steve Borthwick, who had to pull out due to injury. He was also named England Captain for the 2010 summer tour to Australia.

Due to the knee injury he picked up in January 2011, Lewis missed the whole of the 2011 Six Nations tournament however Martin Johnson confirmed Lewis would be England captain for the 2011 Rugby World Cup in New Zealand, provided he was fit. He was selected in the 30-man squad that flew to New Zealand.

On 23 October 2011, Lewis Moody announced his retirement from international rugby.

International tries

England

British & Irish Lions

The Lewis Moody Foundation
The Lewis Moody Foundation, inspired by young rugby fan Joss Rowley Stark, raises funds to promote awareness of brain tumours in children through the award-winning HeadSmart campaign, funds vital research into brain tumour diagnosis and gives families living with critical illness days out of the ordinary to lift spirits and create special memories.

Personal life
Moody married Annie (an interior designer) in June 2006. The couple live in Bradford On Avon in Wiltshire and have a property development company. They have two children.

He enjoys extreme sports—although he suffers from vertigo—and his current hobbies include wakeboarding, travelling and golf.

Moody is a patron and supporter of a number of charities including The Social Entrepreneurs Project, HOPEHIV, Rainbow Trust children's charity and Our Lady's Children's Hospital. In August 2012 Moody highlighted his battle with ulcerative colitis and the impact this had on his training.

In May 2014, Lewis and his wife Annie set up The Lewis Moody Foundation, inspired by Joss Rowley-Stark, to fund ground breaking research to improve the diagnosis and treatment of brain tumours and gives families a day out of the ordinary to lift spirits and create special memories.

In August 2014, Moody was one of 200 public figures who were signatories to a letter to The Guardian opposing Scottish independence in the run-up to September's referendum on that issue.

Honours
England
 Six Nations Championship: 2000, 2001, 2003
Grand Slam: 2003
Triple Crown: 2002, 2003
World Cup: 2003

Leicester Tigers
 Premiership Rugby: 1999, 2000, 2001, 2002, 2007, 2009, 2010
European Cup: 2001, 2002
Anglo-Welsh Cup:  2007

See also
 List of people diagnosed with ulcerative colitis

References

External links
 
 
 Tigers profile
 Lewis Moody photo 1 by sportingheroes.net
 Lewis Moody photo 2 by sportingheroes.net

1978 births
Living people
Alumni of De Montfort University
British & Irish Lions rugby union players from England
England international rugby union players
English rugby union players
Leicester Tigers players
Members of the Order of the British Empire
People educated at Eagle House School
People educated at Oakham School
Rugby union flankers
Rugby union players from Ascot, Berkshire